Hyperventilating and variants may refer to:

 Hyperventilation, the act of hyperventilating
 Hyperventilation syndrome, a medical condition involving hyperventilating
 Cheyne–Stokes respiration, the breathing disorder
 Hypocapnia, a physiological result of hyperventilating
 "Hyperventilating" (song), a 2006 song by Tami Chynn